"De Repente" is a song by Colombian-American singer-songwriter Soraya, taken from her bilingual debut studio album En Esta Noche / On Nights Like This. It was released in 1996 by Island Records and Polydor Records as the lead single from the album. The song was written by Soraya and produced by Soraya, Peter Van Hooke and Rod Argent.

Track listings
CD single
"De Repente"
"Suddenly"
"Avalanche (Live)"

Chart performance

References 

1996 songs
1996 debut singles
Soraya (musician) songs
Songs written by Soraya (musician)
Island Records singles
Song recordings produced by Rod Argent
Polydor Records singles